Two ships of the Royal Navy have been named HMS Campania after the region of Campania in Italy:

  was a British ocean liner owned by the Cunard Steamship Line Shipping Company, launched in 1892. While awaiting demolition in 1914 the British Admiralty bought her to convert into an armed merchant cruiser that could carry seaplanes.
 The first , purchased in 1914, was the passenger liner RMS Campania converted to a seaplane tender. The wreck-site was designated under the Protection of Wrecks Act on 1 December 2001.
 The second  was an escort carrier launched in 1943. She served in World War II and was broken up in 1955.

References
 

Royal Navy ship names
Protected Wrecks of the United Kingdom